Jesús Tonatiú López Álvarez (born 2 August 1997 in Hermosillo) is a Mexican middle-distance runner specialising in the 800 metres. He represented his country in the 800 metres at the 2017 World Championships without qualifying for the semifinals. Later that year he won the gold medal at the 2017 Summer Universiade.

He has qualified to represent Mexico at the 2020 Summer Olympics.

His personal best of 1:45.51 set in Culiacán in 2017 was the national record. In 2021, he eclipsed this record by clocking 1:43.44 in Atlanta, GA.

International competitions

Personal bests

Outdoor
400 metres – 46.69 (Monterrey 2017) 
800 metres – 1:43.44 (Atlanta, Georgia 2021) NR

References

1997 births
Living people
Mexican male middle-distance runners
World Athletics Championships athletes for Mexico
Sportspeople from Sonora
Sportspeople from Hermosillo
Universiade medalists in athletics (track and field)
Central American and Caribbean Games gold medalists for Mexico
Competitors at the 2018 Central American and Caribbean Games
Universiade gold medalists for Mexico
Athletes (track and field) at the 2019 Pan American Games
Pan American Games competitors for Mexico
Universidad de Sonora alumni
Central American and Caribbean Games medalists in athletics
Medalists at the 2017 Summer Universiade
Athletes (track and field) at the 2020 Summer Olympics
Olympic athletes of Mexico
21st-century Mexican people